Chambers Hill is a community in Swatara Township in Dauphin County, Pennsylvania. It is located in the area between 40 degrees 15'41 North and 76 degrees 48'42 West, between Harrisburg and Hershey.  With ranges in elevation from 415–660 feet a view of the Harrisburg skyline to the west, or Three Mile Island to the south, can often be seen.  The aroma of cocoa is often in the air when the wind comes in from the Hershey's Chocolate World to the east.  The area is bounded by U.S. Route 322 to the north and Pennsylvania Route 283 to the West.  Routes 83, 81, 11, 15 and the Pennsylvania Turnpike are within a five-minute drive. Swatara Creek bounds the hill to the east, and Lower Swatara Township and Strites Orchard provide the boundary to the south.  The area is served by one elementary school (Chambers Hill Elementary, K-5, part of Central Dauphin School District), policed by the Swatara Township Police department, and protected from fire by the Chambers Hill Fire Company (Box 456).

Geography of Dauphin County, Pennsylvania
Unincorporated communities in Dauphin County, Pennsylvania
Unincorporated communities in Pennsylvania